The 2004 DFB-Ligapokal Final decided the winner of the 2004 DFB-Ligapokal, the 8th edition of the reiterated DFB-Ligapokal, a knockout football cup competition.

The match was played on 2 August 2004 at the Bruchwegstadion in Mainz. Bayern Munich won the match 3–2 against Werder Bremen for their 5th title.

Teams

Route to the final
The DFB-Ligapokal is a six team single-elimination knockout cup competition. There are a total of two rounds leading up to the final. Four teams enter the preliminary round, with the two winners advancing to the semi-finals, where they will be joined by two additional clubs who were given a bye. For all matches, the winner after 90 minutes advances. If still tied, extra time, and if necessary penalties are used to determine the winner.

Match

Details

References

2004
FC Bayern Munich matches
SV Werder Bremen matches
2004–05 in German football cups